Saline Township is one of fourteen townships in Cooper County, Missouri, USA.  As of the 2000 census, its population was 687.

Saline Township most likely takes its name from Petite Saline Creek.

Geography
According to the United States Census Bureau, Saline Township covers an area of 47.94 square miles (124.16 square kilometers); of this, 46.71 square miles (120.98 square kilometers, 97.44 percent) is land and 1.23 square miles (3.18 square kilometers, 2.56 percent) is water.

Cities, towns, villages
 Wooldridge

Unincorporated towns
 Overton at 
 Pleasant Grove at 
(This list is based on USGS data and may include former settlements.)

Adjacent townships
 Moniteau Township, Howard County (north)
 Katy Township, Boone County (northeast)
 Linn Township, Moniteau County (southeast)
 Prairie Home Township (south)
 Clark Fork Township (southwest)
 Boonville Township (west)

Major highways
  Interstate 70
  Missouri Route 87

School districts
 Boonville School District
 Prairie Home R-V School District

Political districts
 Missouri's 6th congressional district
 State House District 117
 State Senate District 21

References
 United States Census Bureau 2008 TIGER/Line Shapefiles
 United States Board on Geographic Names (GNIS)
 United States National Atlas

External links
 US-Counties.com
 City-Data.com

Townships in Cooper County, Missouri
Townships in Missouri